VTI Instruments Corporation sells precision instrumentation for electronic signal distribution, data acquisition and monitoring. The company's products are used to automate the functional testing of complex electronic systems as well as to monitor and record data that characterizes the physical integrity of aircraft, engines, and other large structures.

Formerly known as VXI Technology, it changed its name in 2009. 
VTI serves the following markets: aerospace, defense, and energy and power generation. VTI's headquarters is located in Irvine, California.

History
Founded in 1990, VTI initially developed prototyping tools and offered custom design services. By 1997, VTI had introduced two new VXI-based instrumentation and signal switching platforms for functional test/ATE – the VMIP and SMIP series. In 2003, VTI purchased Agilent's mechanical test business unit, which expanded the company's product offering to address precision data acquisition and signal conditioning applications.

In 2005, VTI cofounded the LXI standard, an Ethernet-based instrumentation platform for both rack and distributed applications. VTI's first LXI Class A products were on the market by 2006
. In 2009, VTI introduced the EX1266 as the industry's first LXI Class A modular switching and measurement system.

On February 10, 2014 VTI Instruments was acquired by Ametek, Inc., Berwyn, PA, for a reported price of $74 million. VTI Instruments annual sales at the time were approximately $38 million.

References

External links
 VTI Instruments website
 Agilent Technologies and VXI Technology Announce Next-Generation LAN-Based Modular Platform Standard for Automated Test Systems
 VXI Technology Completes Acquisition of Agilent Technologies’ Mechanical Data Acquisition Product Segment
 Industry’s First LXI Class A Scalable Switch and Measurement Subsystem

Electronic test equipment manufacturers
Manufacturing companies based in Greater Los Angeles
Technology companies based in Greater Los Angeles
Companies based in Irvine, California
Electronics companies established in 1990
Technology companies established in 1990
1990 establishments in California